Green Line Coach Station is a coach station in London, England, situated in Bulleid Way, Victoria.

The station offers regional coach services to various destinations to the north and west of London by Green Line Coaches and others, and tour buses operated by Golden Tours. It should not be confused with the nearby Transport for London owned Victoria Coach Station which offers intercity services by National Express Coaches, Megabus and others, or with the Victoria bus station which offers urban services from London Buses.

Services
Reading Buses:
702: Legoland, Windsor and Slough to Green Line Coach Station (extended from Legoland to Bracknell and Reading at peak times)

Arriva Shires & Essex:
748/758/759: Hemel Hempstead to Green Line Coach Station
755/757: Luton and Luton Airport to Green Line Coach Station

References

External links
 Green Line coach station webpage

Bus stations in London
Transport in the City of Westminster
Victoria, London